Hanni & Nanni is a 2010 German film directed by Christine Hartmann. The screenplay of the film was written by Jane Ainscough based on the St. Clare's-books by Enid Blyton.

Plot 
Hanni and Nanni are twins and mischievous children. They are expelled from school and sent to the same boarding school. The film is centered around their life and adventures in that boarding school.they are called 'Stuck up twins' at first but later win the respect of both the students and the teachers. They grow up to be sensible and trustworthy but, still do not forget their sense of mischief.

Cast 
 Sophia Münster as Hanni
 Jana Münster as Nanni
 Hannelore Elsner as Frau Theobald 
 Heino Ferch as George Sullivan 
 Suzanne von Borsody as Frau Mägerlein 
 Anja Kling as Jule Sullivan 
 Katharina Thalbach as Mademoiselle Bertoux 
 Oliver Pocher as Rüdiger Hack 
 Zoe Thurau as Jenny 
 Aleen Jana Kötter as Erika 
 Lisa Vicari as Suse
 Ricarda Zimmerer as Kathrin 
 Emilie Kundrun as Oktavia  
 Eva Haushofer as Antonia  
 Davina Schmid as Linda Turn

References

External links 

2010 films
2010s German-language films
Films based on British novels
Films based on children's books
Films about twin sisters
Films set in schools
Films set in boarding schools
German children's films
Adaptations of works by Enid Blyton
Fictional twins
2010s German films